"Face Dances, Pt. 2" is single written and composed by Pete Townshend, most famously known as the guitarist for the Who. The song appears on Townshend's 1982 solo album All the Best Cowboys Have Chinese Eyes.

Background
Pete Townshend said that the song, in addition to the other songs on All the Best Cowboys Have Chinese Eyes, was about his personal experiences of alienation from both his wife and band members from the Who that he experienced during the early 1980s.

Although it shares a title with it, "Face Dances Pt. 2" was not released on Townshend's band The Who's album Face Dances. In the liner notes for Face Dances, it is claimed that the song was written after the release of the Who album, but authors Steve Grantley and Alan Parker claim in their book, The Who By Numbers: The Story Of The Who Through Their Music, that the song was cut from the album.

Billboard suggested that the "eccentric time shifts and circular melodic scheme" would reduce its appeal to pop music radio stations.

Music video

A companion video for All the Best Cowboys Have Chinese Eyes was also released, featuring "Face Dances, Pt. 2" as one of the concept videos. In some parts of the video, the covers for both the album and "Face Dances, Pt. 2" single sleeves are mimicked while Townshend lip-syncs to the song.

This video has been out of print for years, even though Townshend put the videos of this song and others from the album up on his website in 2000, which were then subsequently uploaded to other video websites on the Internet.

Chart

References

1982 singles
Pete Townshend songs
Songs written by Pete Townshend
Song recordings produced by Pete Townshend
British new wave songs
1982 songs
Capitol Records singles